The Ministry of Justice is a government ministry office of the Republic of Turkey, responsible for justice affairs.

Bekir Bozdağ is the current minister.

See also
Ministry of Justice (Ottoman Empire)
List of Ministers of Justice of Turkey

References

External links
https://twitter.com/adalet_bakanlik

Justice
Turkey